Miguel Ángel Potes Mina (born September 21, 1983) is a Colombian football player who most recently played for Vista Hermosa of El Salvador.

External links
El Grafico Profile 

1983 births
Living people
Colombian footballers
Independiente Santa Fe footballers
Deportes Tolima footballers
Deportivo Pasto footballers
Deportivo Paraguayo footballers
Diriangén FC players
C.D. Vista Hermosa footballers
Colombian expatriate footballers
Expatriate footballers in Argentina
Expatriate footballers in Nicaragua
Expatriate footballers in El Salvador
Colombian expatriate sportspeople in Argentina
Colombian expatriate sportspeople in Nicaragua
Colombian expatriate sportspeople in El Salvador
Association football forwards